Roxane may be:

 Another spelling of the female given name Roxanne
 Roxane, a brand name of the drug roxatidine
  317 Roxane, an asteroid
 Roxana, wife of Alexander the Great
 Roxane, the lover of Cyrano de Bergerac
 Roxane (sailing boat), a 30 ft lugger yacht, designed by Nigel Irens

See also 
 
 
 Roxanne (disambiguation)
 Roxan
 Roksan